Drevníky is a municipality and village in Příbram District in the Central Bohemian Region of the Czech Republic. It has about 400 inhabitants.

Administrative parts
Villages of Drhovce, Nechalov and Slovanská Lhota are administrative parts of Drevníky.

References

Villages in Příbram District